Michael Harris (born 1944 in Glasgow, Scotland) is a Canadian poet and translator. His book Circus was a shortlisted nominee for the Governor General's Award for English language poetry at the 2010 Governor General's Awards.

He has taught at McGill University, Concordia University and Dawson College.

Works

Poetry
 Poems from Ritual (1967)
 Text for Nausikaa (1970)
 Sparks (1976)
 Grace (1978)
 Miss Emily et la Mort (1985)
 In Transit (1985)
 New and Selected Poems (1992)
 Circus (2010)
 The Gamekeeper : Selected Poems 1976-2011 (2017)

Anthologies
 Ten Montreal Poets (1975)
 The Signal Anthology of Contemporary Canadian Poetry (1993)

Translations
 Veiled Countries/Lives: Poetry of Marie-Claire Blais (1984)

References

1944 births
20th-century Canadian poets
20th-century Canadian male writers
Canadian male poets
Writers from Glasgow
Writers from Montreal
Anglophone Quebec people
Living people
Academic staff of Dawson College
Academic staff of McGill University
Academic staff of Concordia University
21st-century Canadian poets
20th-century Canadian translators
21st-century Canadian translators
21st-century Canadian male writers
Canadian male non-fiction writers